The giant river frog (Limnonectes leporinus) is a species of frog in the family Dicroglossidae. It is endemic to Borneo, and found in Brunei, Kalimantan (Indonesia), and Sabah and Sarawak (Malaysia).

Giant river frogs inhabit the banks of small to large, rocky streams in hilly lowland rainforests. 
The tadpoles develop in quiet side pools of streams. It is locally affected by deforestation and over-exploitation, but it is not considered threatened by the IUCN.

References

Limnonectes
Fauna of Brunei
Amphibians of Indonesia
Amphibians of Malaysia
Endemic fauna of Borneo
Taxonomy articles created by Polbot
Amphibians described in 1923
Amphibians of Borneo